David Dunn (born June 10, 1972) is a former American football wide receiver and return specialist in the National Football League. He was drafted by the Cincinnati Bengals in the fifth round of the 1995 NFL Draft. He played college football at Fresno State after transferring from Bakersfield Junior College.

Dunn also played for the Pittsburgh Steelers, Cleveland Browns, and Oakland Raiders.

Dunn is currently the head football coach at Lincoln High School in San Diego, California.

Early years
Dunn attended Samuel F. B. Morse High School in Southeast San Diego for all his four years of high school. Mainly playing his senior year. He broke all kinds of records. He the MVP of the team. He was an outstanding wide receiver and punt returner as a senior.  

1972 births
Living people
African-American players of American football
American football wide receivers
American football return specialists
Fresno State Bulldogs football players
Cincinnati Bengals players
Pittsburgh Steelers players
Cleveland Browns players
Oakland Raiders players
Players of American football from San Diego
People from Grant County, Oklahoma
21st-century African-American sportspeople
20th-century African-American sportspeople